Tammy Garcia (born August 27, 1969, in Los Angeles, California) is a Santa Clara Pueblo sculptor and Ceramic artist. Garcia translates Pueblo pottery forms and iconography into sculptures in bronze and other media.

Background
Tammy Garcia is a member of the Santa Clara Pueblo. She currently lives in Taos, New Mexico with family.

Tammy Garcia comes from a long line of Santa Clara Pueblo artists. Her great-great-great-grandmother Sara Fina Tafoya was a potter. Her great-great aunt, Margaret Tafoya, was a noted potter of the early 20th century, along with her sister Christina Naranjo. Subsequent generations of potters in the family included Mary Cain, and Linda Cain, Tammy Garcia's mother.

At the age of 21, she was awarded first prize at the Gallup Intertribal Ceremonials, the first of many awards she has received. Starting in 1999, Garcia branched out into bronze, and now creates both ceramics and bronze sculptures.

Selected exhibitions
 1987-88 Inter-Tribal Indian Ceremonial, Gallup, NM
 1990 O'Odham Tash, Casa Grande, AZ
 1990 Andrews Pueblo Pottery, Albuquerque, NM
 1991 Eight Northern Indian Pueblos Arts & Crafts, Ohkay Owingeh, NM
 1991–98 Gallery 10, Group Show, Scottsdale, AZ and Santa Fe, NM
 1992 O'Odham Tash, Casa Grande, AZ
 1992 Gallery 10, Group Show, Beverly Hills, CA and Santa Fe, NM
 1993–98 Santa Fe Indian Market, Santa Fe, NM
 1994–1998 Gallery 10, group shows, Scottsdale, AZ
 1995 Inter-Tribal Ceremonial, Gallup, NM
 1998 Blue Rain Gallery, The Harris Collection Show, Taos, NM
 1999–2003 Blue Rain Gallery, annual Indian Market show, Taos, NM
 1999–2002, 2004, 2006 Blue Rain Gallery, annual Show on the Road, various locations
 2001 Peabody Essex Museum, Salem, MA
 2001 Heard Museum, Phoenix, AZ
 2002 Changing Hands: Art without Reservations I, American Craft Museum, New York, NY
 2003 From the States Exhibit, National Museum for Women in the Arts, Washington, D.C.
 2003 Blue Rain Gallery, 10th Anniversary Celebration, Taos, NM
 2004–08 Blue Rain Gallery, annual Indian Market show, Santa Fe, NM
 2005 Blue Rain Gallery, Visions in Glass with Preston Singletary, Santa Fe, NM
 2005 "Tammy Garcia Retrospective", Eiteljorg Museum, Indianapolis, IN
 2007 Blue Rain Gallery, 15th Anniversary Celebration, Taos, NM
 2007 "New Visions: Inspired by Tradition" with Evelyn Fredericks, Museum of Indian Arts and Culture, Santa Fe, NM
 2007 SOFA Chicago (Sculptural Objects and Functional Art), Blue Rain Gallery, Chicago, IL
 2008 "Beyond Tradition: The Pueblo Pottery of Tammy Garcia", National Museum of Women in the Arts, Washington, DC
 2008 Heart of the West Art Exhibition, National Cowgirl Museum and Hall of Fame, Fort Worth, TX
 2008 Blue Rain Gallery, "Visions in Glass II" with Preston Singletary, Santa Fe, NM
 2008 SOFA New York (Sculptural Objects and Functional Art), Blue Rain Gallery, New York, NY
 2008 SOFA Chicago (Sculptural Objects and Functional Art), Blue Rain Gallery, Chicago, IL
 2009 LA Art Show, Blue Rain Gallery, Los Angeles, CA

Notes

References

External links
 Indian Market: New Directions in Southwest Native American Pottery

1969 births
Sculptors from New Mexico
Living people
Native American potters
Native American sculptors
Pueblo artists
Santa Clara Pueblo people
Women potters
Native American women artists
American women ceramists
American ceramists
American women sculptors
20th-century Native Americans
21st-century Native Americans
20th-century Native American women
21st-century Native American women